2783 km is a rural locality (a settlement serving a railway station) in Kulikovskoye Rural Settlement of Kalachinsky District, Omsk Oblast, Russia. The population was 20 as of 2010.

Geography 
The village is located 4 km west-south-west from Kalachinsk.

Streets 
 Ostanovochnaya

References 

Rural localities in Omsk Oblast